AFEX, based in Raleigh, North Carolina, is a specialty manufacturer of vehicle fire suppression systems.

AFEX was founded in 1968, initially to serve the timber harvesting industry in the southern pine forests. Later, this was expanded to the waste handling industry, primarily used to address the need found at sanitary landfills.

In 1986, the business was purchased by Bonaventure Group, Inc. Shortly afterward, much of the company’s focus shifted to providing vehicle fire suppression systems to the mining market, first in the United States and then, beginning in 1994, in Latin American countries. AFEX fire suppression systems are typically found on: excavators, haul trucks, power shovels, wheel loaders, bulldozers, graders, etc. Other industries served where fire is a significant hazard are steel, mass transit, pulp and paper and agriculture.

AFEX's fire suppression systems carry ActivFire, FM and CE approvals. AFEX completed its approval to FM Standard 5970 for heavy duty mobile equipment protection systems on September 17, 2017.

References

Fire suppression